Albert May House (218 Church Street) in Stevensville, Montana, is a historic house on the National Register of Historic Places.  The house was built in 1898. Its third owner, Albert May, served as Mayor of Stevensville. The house is known as an example of the Queen Anne style architecture found in Montana's Bitterroot Valley.

References

External links 
Albert May House at Landmark Hunter.com

Houses in Ravalli County, Montana
Houses on the National Register of Historic Places in Montana
National Register of Historic Places in Ravalli County, Montana
Houses completed in 1898
Queen Anne architecture in Montana
1898 establishments in Montana